Patellar subluxation syndrome, is an injury that is concerned with the kneecap. Patellar subluxation is more common than patellar dislocation and is just as disabling.

In this condition, the patella repetitively subluxates and places strain on the medial restraints and excessive stress/tension on the patellofemoral joint. Patellar subluxation can be caused by osseous abnormalities, such as incorrect articulation of the femoral groove with the patella, trochlear dysplasia, or patella alta, which is a distance of greater than 20 mm between the tibial tubercle and the trochlear groove. It can also result from soft-tissue abnormalities, such as a torn medial patellofemoral ligament, or a weakened vastus medialis obliquus. Symptoms are regulated by the amount of activity. Such pain is commonly caused by running and jumping sports and activities that place large forces on the patellofemoral joint.

Signs and symptoms
Symptoms usually include:

 Knee buckles and can no longer support your weight
 Kneecap slips off to the side
 Knee catches during movement
 Pain in the front of the knee that increases with activity
 Pain when sitting
 Stiffness
 Creaking or cracking sounds during movement
 Swelling

Patellar subluxation was once thought to occur mainly in women, due to the frequency of genu valgum and lax ligaments. However, now the frequency of this condition in any athletic person, man or woman, is apparent.

Diagnosis

Treatment

Conservative treatment
Conservative treatment in primary acute LPD (lateral patellar dislocation) is the therapy of choice. It includes a multimodal approach with behavioural education of the patient, physical therapy, braces, weight reduction and pain medication.

Physical therapy especially focuses on muscle strengthening and proprioceptive exercises. The vastus medialis oblique muscle is described to have an important role in functional stabilization of the patella against lateral vector force. Proprioceptive exercises and strengthening of the hip abductors and positioning of the foot are crucial, especially indicated in patient with miserable malalignment syndrome or medial collapse.

Several patellar braces or taping methods exist to improve return to sport. They may however not alter medial or lateral displacement, but can be helpful as a diagnostic tool for occult patellofemoral instability.

Surgical treatment options
Increasing age is associated with decreased physical activity after surgical stabilization, and therefore in growing and very active athletes early surgical treatment intervention needs to be considered. Reconstruction of the MPFL (medial patellofemoral ligament) in patients with minor trochlear dysplasia is technically possible without interfering with distal growth plate of the femur, however, large studies are missing. Osseous articular correction before epiphyseal closure is contraindicated.

In adult patients with recurrent LPD and without trochlear dysplasia or type A or C according to Dejour classification, MPFL reconstruction alone might be beneficial, in which unchanged osseous or dynamic instability will be compensated. Patients with an important supra-trochlear spur as in type B and D trochlear dysplasia and chronic instability are more reluctant to conservative and soft-tissue surgical treatment options. In such cases sulcus-deepening trochleoplasty should be performed. Typically, post-surgical results are more favourable when instability was the main symptom. Hence, in such patients low-pivoting physical activity may be re-achieved.

References

Sports medicine
Syndromes
Orthopedic problems